Grossen is a German surname. Notable people with the surname include:

Jürg Grossen (born 1969), Swiss politician
Françoise Grossen (born 1943), textile artist

See also
Rossen

German-language surnames